The women's freestyle 55 kg is a competition featured at the 2014 European Wrestling Championships, and was held in Vantaa, Finland on 1 April 2014.

Medalists

Results
Legend
F — Won by fall

Bracket

Repechage

References

External links
Official website

Women's freestyle 55 kg